Lucky Boy is a 1929 American musical comedy-drama film directed by Norman Taurog and Charles C. Wilson and starring George Jessel. The film was mainly a silent film with synchronized music and sound effects, as well as some talking sequences. The film's plot bore strong similarities to that of the hit 1927 film The Jazz Singer, which had originally been intended to star Jessel (the star of The Jazz Singer stage production) before Al Jolson took over the role.

Plot
A young Jewish man works in his father's jewelry business, but he does not like it at all—he wants to be an entertainer, something he knows that his father would never approve of. He comes up with a scheme to put on his own show in a theater and show his father that he can be a success, but things do not work out quite as well as he planned.

Cast
George Jessel as Georgie Jessel
Gwen Lee as Mrs. Ellis 
Richard Tucker as Mr. Ellis
Gayne Whitman as Mr. Trent
Margaret Quimby as Eleanor
Rosa Rosanova as Mamma Jessel
William H. Strauss as Papa Jessel
Mary Doran as Becky
'Patty and Fields' (amateur night act)
Joe Sevely (amateur night act)
Glenda Farrell as a secretary (uncredited)
William Gargan as Bit Part (uncredited)
Sig Ruman as Bit Part (uncredited)
Charles C. Wilson as a stage emcee (uncredited)

Production

The film was originally developed with the title The Schlemiel based on a story by Viola Brothers Shore. It was initially filmed without sound by director Norman Taurog under the working title of The Ghetto in April 1928, reportedly in a "record time" of twelve days. Based on his role in the original stage production of The Jazz Singer, Jessel was billed as "The Original Jazz Singer" in advertisements. Jessel was credited with writing the spoken and intertitle dialogue.

Music
The film's theme song (featured four times) was "My Mother's Eyes", which (along with the titular song "Lucky Boy") was composed by Abel Baer with lyrics by L. Wolfe Gilbert. The film also featured a score by Hugo Riesenfeld; "You're My Real Sweetheart" and "In My Bouquet of Memories" by Sam M. Lewis, Joe Young, and William Axt; "Keep Sweeping the Cobwebs Off the Moon" by  Sam M. Lewis, Joe Young, and Oscar Levant; and "My Blackbirds are Bluebirds Now" by Irving Caesar and Cliff Friend.

Alongside Lucky Boy'''s theatrical release, "My Mother's Eyes" was released by RCA Victor as a single (Victor 21852), backed with "When the Curtain Comes Down" written by Carl Hoefle, Al Lewis & Al Sherman. As well as becoming Jessel's signature number, the song was re-recorded several times, including an instrumental version by Tab Smith (1952), Frankie Valli's debut 1953 single (which also featured in the 2005 jukebox musical Jersey Boys and its 2014 film adaptation), and the titular song from the Sonny Stitt album, My Mother's Eyes (1963).

Preservation
Considered to be lost for many years, Lucky Boy'' is still in existence with a copy of the film held in the UCLA Film and Television Archive.

References

External links

Lobby cards at Vitaphone Varieties (blog)

1929 musical comedy films
American black-and-white films
American musical comedy films
1920s English-language films
Films about Jews and Judaism
Films directed by Norman Taurog
Tiffany Pictures films
1920s rediscovered films
Rediscovered American films
1920s American films